Hyalite is a transparent form of opal with a glassy lustre. It may exhibit an internal play of colors if natural inclusions are present. It is also called Muller's glass, water opal, and jalite. Müller's glass is named after its discoverer, Franz-Joseph Müller von Reichenstein.

Properties
Hyalite's Mohs hardness is 5.5 to 6 and has a specific gravity of 1.9 - 2.1.  It has no planes of cleavage but fractures conchoidally, is clear or translucent and has a globular structure.  Its luster is vitreous and its streak is white.  Hyalite is an amorphous form of silica (SiO2) formed as a volcanic sublimate in volcanic or pegmatic rock and is therefore considered a mineraloid.  It contains 3 - 8% water, either as a silanol group or in molecular form.

Uses
Opalescent hyalite is used in jewellery, and well-formed samples are of interest to collectors due to their unusual appearance, mode of formation and relative rarity.  It is sometimes mistaken for resin opal or silica glass since they both may appear clear and globular, but it can be identified under ultraviolet light due to its bright green fluorescence.

External links
Mindat data
Explanation from Fluorescent Mineral Society

Opals